Jacob Heinl (born 3 October 1986) is a German handball player for the German national team.

References

1986 births
Living people
German male handball players
Sportspeople from Hamburg